Down Home is an album by The Nashville String Band. The band consisted of Chet Atkins and Homer and Jethro.

Track listing

Side one 
 "Under the Double Eagle" (Josef Wagner)
 "Just a Closer Walk with Thee" (Traditional)
 "The Arkansas Traveler" (Sandford C. Faulkner)
 "Cold, Cold Heart" (Hank Williams)
 "Fraulein"

Side two 
 "Wildwood Flower"
 "Tennessee Rag"
 "Maiden's Prayer"
 "South" (Ray Charles, T. Hayes, Bennie Moten)
 "Mockingbird Hill" (Vaughn Horton)

Personnel 
Chet Atkins – guitar
Henry "Homer" Haynes – guitar
Kenneth "Jethro" Burns – mandolin

1970 albums
RCA Victor albums
Albums produced by Chet Atkins
The Nashville String Band albums